Reklaw may refer to:

Places
Reklaw, Texas, a city in Cherokee and Rusk Counties in the U.S. state of Texas
Reklaw Formation, a geologic formation in Texas preserving fossils dating back to the Paleogene period.

People
Jesse Reklaw (born 1971), American cartoonist and painter, author of the syndicated dream-based comic strip Slow Wave
The Reklaws, a Canadian country music duo